Bakshaish rugs and carpets are a type of tapestry from the village of Bakshaish in north-west Iran. Bakshaish is situated in the mountainous region 60 miles east of the large city of Tabriz. It's rugs are notable for their diverse abstract adaptations of age-old tribal and classical Persian motifs.

Carpets and rugs
Bakshaish rugs adapt the style and sensibility of the most valued smaller tribal carpets from Northern Iran. Bakshaish rugs are considered among the finest examples of larger rugs from the region. Taking their inspiration from Persian classical carpets, the abstract patterns of Bakshaish rugs and carpets feature bold, geometric designs. Often, following form of village pieces, Bakshaish carpets apply scattered graphics filling the woven field. Alternatively, they use empty space to allow graphics to stand out.

Most popularly Bakshaish rugs utilize curvilinear medallion designs, transforming classical cartoons into more abstract and energetic drawings similar to Caucasian tribal rugs. In the late 19th century the designs produced in Bakshaish carpets were akin to those of the Arak weavers.

Sources

Eiland, Murray L. Oriental Rugs. Boston: New York Graphic Society, 1976. 
Neff, Ivan C. and Carol V. Maggs. Dictionary of Oriental Rugs. London: AD. Donker LTD, 1977. 
Winitz, Jan. The Guide to Purchasing an Oriental Rug. California: Publishers Group West, 1985. 

Persian rugs and carpets
Heris County